The 1987 Girabola was the ninth season of top-tier football competition in Angola. Atlético Petróleos de Luanda were the defending champions.

The league comprised 14 teams, the bottom three of which were relegated.

Petro de Luanda were crowned champions, winning their 4th title, and second in a row, while Desportivo da Chela, Progresso do Sambizanga and União Sport do Bié were relegated.

Mavango Kiala aka Mavó of Ferroviário da Huíla finished as the top scorer with 20 goals.

Changes from the 1986 season
Relegated: Desportivo de Benguela, Inter da Lunda Sul, Leões de Luanda
Promoted: Dínamos do Kwanza Sul, Progresso do Sambizanga, União do Bié

League table

Results

Season statistics

Top scorer
 Mavango Kiala Mavó

Champions

External links
Federação Angolana de Futebol

Angola
Angola
Girabola seasons